Kvítkov is a municipality and village in Česká Lípa District in the Liberec Region of the Czech Republic. It has about 200 inhabitants.

Geography
It lies mostly in the Ralsko Uplands. The Robečský Stream flows along the eastern municipal border.

History
The first written mention of Kvítkov is from 1295, when the village was owned by Jan of Kvítkov. Until the 15th century, Kvítkov was owned by the Vlk of Kvítkov knights.

From 1980 to 1991, Kvítkov was an administrative part of Česká Lípa. Since 1992, it has been a separate municipality.

Sights
The Church of Saint James the Great is a baroque church from 1726. The architect of the church was probably Václav Špaček.

Kvítkov Castle is a ruin of a castle built in the first half of the 13th century. The castle was abandoned already in the 13th century. Only few remains and a cellar carved in the rock, which is still used today, have been preserved.

References

External links

Villages in Česká Lípa District